Daqing Sartu Airport  is an airport (class 4C) serving the city of Daqing in Heilongjiang Province, China.  Construction started in 2007 with a total investment of 500 million yuan, and the airport was opened on 1 September 2009.

Facilities
The airport has one runway that is 2,600 meters long and 45 meters wide, and a 14,000 square-meter terminal building.  It is designed to handle 1.47 million passengers annually by 2020.

Airlines and destinations

See also
List of airports in China
List of the busiest airports in China

References

Airports in Heilongjiang
Airports established in 2009
2009 establishments in China
Daqing